is a Japanese actress. Her uncle is the jazz pianist Yōsuke Yamashita. She won the award for best actress at the 19th Hochi Film Award for Crest of Betrayal.

Filmography

Film
 cf girl (cfガール, 1989)
 Swimming Upstream (バタアシ金魚, 1990), Sonoko
 The River with No Bridge (橋のない川, 1992), Nanae Minemura
 Crest of Betrayal (忠臣蔵外伝 四谷怪談, 1994), Oiwa
 Kyoko (KYOKO, 1996), Kyoko
 Happy People  (HAPPY PEOPLE, 1997)
 Young Thugs: Nostalgia (岸和田少年愚連隊 望郷, 1998), Miss Itō
 Tales of Terror (怪談新耳袋「手袋」, 2004)
 Koi wa go-shichi-go! (恋は五・七・五!全国高校生俳句甲子園大会, 2004)
 Nureta akai ito (濡れた赫い糸, 2005)
 Female (female フィーメイル, 2005), Masako Kihara
 Desire (欲望, 2005)
 Nezu no ban (寝ずの番, 2006)
 Kanashiki Tenshi (悲しき天使, 2006)
 A Long Walk (長い散歩, 2006), Saichi's mother
 Like a Dragon (龍が如く 劇場版, 2007), Yumi Sawamura
 The Harimaya Bridge (The Harimaya Bridge はりまや橋, 2009), Noriko Kubo
 The Tempest 3D  (2012)
 Eden (2012)
 Lesson of Evil (2012)
 Love For Beginners (2012)
 Monster (2013) 
 A Courtesan with Flowered Skin (2013)
 5-nijyu-Go (2014)
 Shinya Shokudo (2015), Tamako Kawashima
 Cosmetic Wars (2017)
 The Lowlife (2017)
 Snow Flower (2019)
 First Love (2021)
 Rika: Love Obsessed Psycho (2021), Rika Amamiya
 Masquerade Night (2021)
 Just Remembering (2022)
 In Love and Deep Water (2023), Misaki Kuruma

Television
 Tekkōki Mikazuki (2000)
 Gunshi Kanbei (2014), Okon
 Rika (2019), Rika Amamiya
 Detective Yuri Rintaro (2020), Sakura Hara
 Rika: Rebirth (2021), Rika Amamiya
 Welcome Home, Monet (2021), Satoko Takamura

References

External links 
 
 
profile - yahoo.co.jp (ja)
filmography - allcinema.net (ja)

Actresses from Kanagawa Prefecture
Japanese film actresses
Japanese television actresses
1972 births
Living people
People from Fujisawa, Kanagawa
Former Stardust Promotion artists
Horikoshi High School alumni
20th-century Japanese actresses
21st-century Japanese actresses